MS Stena Embla is a passenger and vehicle RoPax ferry operated by Stena Line between Birkenhead and Belfast.

History
The third of the  ferries, the ship was constructed at the AVIC Weihai Shipyard in China and floated on 15 November 2019. The ship competed its sea trials in the Yellow Sea before the end of October 2020, and was delivered to Stena at Weihai on 1 December 2020.

The ship began its maiden commercial voyage from Rosslare to Cherbourg on 14 January 2021, and was transferred to the Birkenhead to Belfast route by 26 January 2021.

Stena Mersey was transferred to operate between Nynäshamn and Ventspils on the Baltic Sea, following a rebuild and renaming as Stena Baltica.

References

External links
Stena Line: Stena Embla

Embla
2020 ships